Case Island is a roughly circular ice-covered island,  in diameter, lying off the coast of Palmer Land, Antarctica. The island lies in Carroll Inlet between the mainland and Smyley Island. It was mapped by the United States Geological Survey from surveys and from U.S. Navy aerial photographs, 1961–66. The name was suggested by Finn Ronne for Senator Francis H. Case, who assisted in obtaining Government support to provide a ship for the Ronne Antarctic Research Expedition, 1947–48.

See also 
 List of Antarctic and sub-Antarctic islands

References 

Islands of Palmer Land